is a private junior college in Bunkyo, Tokyo, Japan.

History 
The college opened in April 1951, but the predecessor of the school, Mimurodo Education Group, was founded in 1938. The junior college is not attached to Toho College of Music.

External links 
 

Educational institutions established in 1951
Japanese junior colleges
1951 establishments in Japan
Universities and colleges in Tokyo
Private universities and colleges in Japan